Miski may refer to:
Miski, Chad
Miski, Iran